The Ferrari 637 was a Ferrari racing car designed to run in the American CART series. It was designed by Gustav Brunner and, although tested and unveiled to the press in 1986, it never raced.

Background

Unhappy with the impending engine regulations in Formula One (which stipulated that the engine must be a V8 configuration), Enzo Ferrari commissioned the design of an IndyCar. He made no secret of his desire to win the Indianapolis 500; however, many believe that his threat to leave F1 for CART was merely a bargaining tool to make the FIA rethink their engine regulations. Ferrari approached Goodyear about the possible CART program, and Goodyear recommended the Truesports CART team for a research and development partnership.

After the 1985 CART season, Truesports and driver Bobby Rahal traveled to Italy to demonstrate a March 85C-Cosworth. The car was tested by both Rahal and Ferrari driver Michele Alboreto at the Fiorano test track. Afterwards, the car was taken apart and studied by Ferrari. In 1986, Ferrari designed and built their own car, which was tested by Alboreto.

Ultimately, this car was never raced as a Ferrari, but was passed on to fellow FIAT subsidiary Alfa Romeo, who were looking to improve their market share in the US.

Technical

For a car that was supposedly only a bargaining tool, the 637 was well engineered and carefully thought out. The upper body was made of aluminium, mechanically bonded and glued to the lower carbon frame. The Type 034 engine was a turbocharged 32-valve, 90-degree 2.65-litre V8, as per the CART regulations, which used upward mounted exhausts.

When Alfa Romeo unveiled their (unrelated) 2.65-litre IndyCar engine, it was in the back of a March chassis; however it was seen testing at Fiorano Circuit in the 637 chassis.

See also
Lotus 96T
Alfa Romeo's IndyCar project
Porsche's IndyCar activities

References

External links

Atlas F1 article (with images)
Grandprix.com article 
 Quando a Ferrari quase foi para a Champ Car

637
American Championship racing cars